King is a 1978 American television miniseries based on the life of Martin Luther King Jr., the American civil rights leader.  It aired for three consecutive nights on NBC from February 12 through 14, 1978.

Production
Several real-life figures from the Civil Rights Movement had minor roles in the production, including then-Atlanta mayor Maynard Jackson, King's sister Christine King Farris, his niece Alveda King, and his four children: Yolanda, Martin III, Dexter and Bernice. Donzaleigh Abernathy, Tony Bennett, Julian Bond and Ramsey Clark each portrayed themselves.

Reception
The miniseries earned nine Emmy Award nominations, including nominations for actors Paul Winfield, Cicely Tyson and Ossie Davis.

Though heavily promoted, the series met with controversy and was a huge ratings disappointment.  The first installment was the lowest rated of all 64 prime time programs for the week of its debut.

Cast
Paul Winfield as Martin Luther King Jr.
Cicely Tyson as Coretta Scott King
Tony Bennett as himself
Roscoe Lee Browne as Phillip Harrison
Lonny Chapman as Chief Frank Holloman
Ossie Davis as Martin Luther King Sr.
Cliff DeYoung as Robert F. Kennedy
Al Freeman Jr. as Damon Lockwood
Clu Gulager as William C. Sullivan
Steven Hill as Stanley Levison
William Jordan as John F. Kennedy
Warren J. Kemmerling as Lyndon B. Johnson
Lincoln Kilpatrick as Jerry Waring
Kenneth McMillan as Theophilus E. "Bull" Connor
Howard E. Rollins Jr. as Andrew Young
David Spielberg as David Beamer
Dolph Sweet as J. Edgar Hoover
Dick Anthony Williams as Malcolm X
Art Evans as A.D. King
Frances Foster as Alberta Williams King
Tony Holmes as Martin Luther King III
Felecia Hunter as Yolanda King
Roger Robinson as Fred Shuttlesworth
Ernie Lee Banks as Ralph Abernathy
Donzaleigh Abernathy as herself
Alveda King as Babysitter
Julian Bond as himself
Ramsey Clark as himself
Christine King Farris as Ferris Church Soloist
Maynard Jackson as Wallace Whitmore
Bernice King as Student
Dexter Scott King as Student #2
Martin Luther King III as Rev. Briggs
Yolanda King as Rosa Parks

Annazette Chase was considered to portray Coretta Scott King.

Home media
The miniseries was released on DVD on January 11, 2005.

See also
 Civil rights movement in popular culture
Notable film portrayals of Nobel laureates

References

External links
 
 

1978 American television series debuts
1978 American television series endings
1978 films
1978 drama films
Television series based on actual events
Films about race and ethnicity
1970s American television miniseries
American biographical series
Civil rights movement in television
Films about Martin Luther King Jr.
Cultural depictions of Lyndon B. Johnson
Cultural depictions of John F. Kennedy
Cultural depictions of Robert F. Kennedy
Cultural depictions of Martin Luther King Jr.
Cultural depictions of J. Edgar Hoover
Cultural depictions of Rosa Parks
Television series by Filmways
Films about activists
NBC original programming
Coretta Scott King
Films produced by Paul Maslansky